Kfar Avoda is an institutional settlement that operates a center for special education in central Israel. Located in the Sharon plain around two kilometres east of Tel Mond, it falls under the jurisdiction of Lev HaSharon Regional Council.

History
Before the 20th century the area formed part of the Forest of Sharon. It was an open woodland dominated by Mount Tabor Oak, which extended from Kfar Yona in the north to Ra'anana in the south. The local Arab inhabitants traditionally used the area for pasture, firewood and intermittent cultivation. The intensification of settlement and agriculture in the coastal plain during the 19th century led to deforestation and subsequent environmental degradation.

The village was founded in 1942 and is run by the Welfare and Social Services Ministry.

References 

Villages in Israel
Education in Israel
Populated places established in 1942
1942 establishments in Mandatory Palestine
Populated places in Central District (Israel)